The Chehalis Cross, or Chehalis Monument, is a Celtic cross memorial commemorating the eight people who died when the tugboat Chehalis sank off Stanley Park. The monument is installed west of Brockton Point in Vancouver, British Columbia.

Sinking of the Chehalis
The  wooden steam ship Chehalis, owned by the Union S.S. Company of Vancouver, sank at about 2 p.m. July 21, 1906, killing 8 of the 15 people on board, following a collision with the Canadian Pacific Railway's Princess Victoria, a  steam ship. The seven survivors were rescued by the keeper of the nearby Brockton Point lighthouse.

The Chehalis had been chartered to carry passengers to British Columbia's north coast and had just embarked from North Vancouver in fine weather, passing Brockton Point while heading out of Burrard Inlet. The Princess Victoria embarked from the Canadian Pacific Railway dock in Vancouver carrying 219 passengers. The Princess Victoria corrected its course for a small launch before running over the Chehalis. The official investigation blamed the Princess Victoria for the collision.

References

External links

 
 

Monuments and memorials in Vancouver
Outdoor sculptures in Vancouver
Stanley Park